Eduardo Spohr (born June 1976 in Copacabana, Rio de Janeiro) is a Brazilian journalist, teacher, blogger, podcaster and fantasy and historical fiction writer. He is the author of A Batalha do Apocalipse (The Battle of the Apocalypse in free translation), one of the best selling fiction books of all time in Brazil. Spohr is also widely known as a regular contributor to the popular Brazilian podcast Nerdcast, created by the entertainment website Jovem Nerd.

Biography
Spohr is the son of an airline pilot and a flight attendant and because of that, he had the chance to travel to many countries during his childhood, when he produced his first fictional writings. Although having no religion, his contact with different cultures and the imminence of conflict in the Cold War during his youth, motivated him to write about the end of the world and religion in his book A Batalha do Apocalipse, using aspects and the history of various civilizations in the book plot. Before formally starting his career as a writer, he studied Social Communication and initially dedicated himself to the Advertising industry, but later on switched to his preferred occupation as a journalist. He worked the first years of the 2000s as a reporter, content analyst and editor for the iBest and Click21 portals respectively.

As a contributor to the Joven Nerd website  he published his first book at the Nerdstore, the site's virtual web store, under the label NerdBooks, selling more than 4000 copies, yet without the support of any publisher. In June 2010 the Grupo Editorial Record published A Batalha do Apocalipse under the label Verus, selling, until December of the same year, 50 thousand copies. Soon after, in 2011, released the first book of the Filhos do Éden Series named Filhos do Éden: Herdeiros de Atlântida, later on 2013 released the second title of the series called Filhos do Éden: Anjos da Morte and in October, 2015 released the third title of the series called Filhos do Éden: Paraíso Perdido.

Influences
The list of works of fiction which influenced Eduardo goes from Highlander to The Matrix, through childhood cartoons like Saint Seiya. Regarding the writers the list encompasses Robert E. Howard, J. R. R. Tolkien, Neil Gaiman, Alan Moore, Frank Miller, Garth Ennis, Stephen King and H.P. Lovecraft.

Criticism
Eduardo is considered by the world-renowned novelist Paulo Coelho one of the stars of this generation of yet unknown writers to the general public.

Bibliography
 A Batalha do Apocalipse, Verus - 2010;
 Filhos do Éden: Herdeiros de Atlântida, Verus - 2011;
 Protocolo Bluehand: Alienígenas, NerdBooks - 2011;
 Filhos do Éden: Anjos da Morte, Verus - 2013;
 Filhos do Éden: Paraíso Perdido, Verus - 2015;
Filhos do Éden: Universo Expandido, Verus - 2016;
Roma Invicta: Santo Guerreiro, Verus - 2020;

References

1976 births
Living people
Brazilian fantasy writers
Brazilian science fiction writers